Aq Cheshmeh may refer to:
 Aq Cheshmeh, Fars
 Aq Cheshmeh, North Khorasan
 Aq Cheshmeh, Razavi Khorasan